FNN may refer to:

 False nearest neighbor algorithm
 Farnborough North railway station, in England
 Feedforward neural network
 Financial News Network, a defunct American television network
 Flat neighborhood network, a type of computer network
 Fox News Network, U.S. cable news network
 Fuji News Network, a Japanese television network
 Fuzzy neural network
 Fake news network, a mockery used for CNN primarily during and a while after the 2016 USA election.

 Friday Night Nexus, a fictional wrestling gameplay series on YouTube by HeelDiggy